Emery Farmstead, also known as Chancellor-Emery Farmstead, is an historic farm located at the junction of Emery Road and Emery Lane, about  southeast of Port Angeles, Washington. The farm is composed of five well preserved historic buildings on a  area. The log cabin is the newest building in the farmstead and was built in 1889. Shortly after its construction, and before 1900, the two-story log house was built nearby. The granary and root cellar are two log structures located shortly east of the buildings. A log shed is the original living quarters, built in 1885.

The farm was added to the National Register of Historic Places in 1988.

References

Houses completed in 1889
Farms on the National Register of Historic Places in Washington (state)
Buildings and structures in Clallam County, Washington
Port Angeles, Washington
National Register of Historic Places in Clallam County, Washington